"Lady Brown" is a single release, by Japanese hip-hop producer Nujabes. The single was released in 12" vinyl and sold in Nujabes' own record stores 'Tribe' located in Tokyo. The single featured Cise Starr from Cyne and Nao Tokui. Lady Brown was featured on Nujabes' first solo album Metaphorical Music.

The song is originally sampled from Luiz Bonfa's "Shade of The Mango Tree" from Bonfa Burrows Brazil 1978. The record was recorded, mixed, and mastered at Park Avenue Studios.

Track listing
A1 "Lady Brown (Street Version)" Featuring Cise Starr
A2 "Lady Brown (Clean Version)" Featuring Cise Starr
B1 "Lady Brown (Instrumental)"
B2 "Rotary Park" Featuring Nao Tokui

References

External links
http://hydeout.net/
http://www.whosampled.com/artist/Nujabes/

2003 singles
2003 songs
Jazz rap songs